The 2017  IIHF World Women's U18 Championship Division I Group A, Group B and Group B Qualification were three international under-18 women's ice hockey tournaments run by the International Ice Hockey Federation. The tournaments made up the second, third and fourth levels of competition at the 2017 IIHF World Women's U18 Championships respectively. The Division I Group A tournament took place between 8 January and 14 January 2017 in Budapest, Hungary. The tournament was won by Germany who gained promotion to the Championship Division for 2018 while France finished last and was relegated to the Division I Group B competition. The Division I Group B tournament took place between 8 January and 14 January 2017 in Katowice, Poland. Italy won the tournament and gained promotion to Division I Group A while Kazakhstan was relegated to Division I Group B Qualification after finishing in last place. The Division I Group B Qualification tournament was held in San Sebastián, Spain from 26 January to 29 January 2017. The tournament was won by Australia who gained promotion to Division I Group B for 2018.

Division I Group A tournament

The Division I Group A tournament began on 8 January 2017 in Budapest, Hungary with games played at Tüskecsarnok. Germany, Hungary, Norway and Slovakia returned to the competition after missing promotion to the Championship Division at the previous years World Championships. Austria gained promotion to Division I Group A after finishing first in last years Division I Qualification and France was relegated from the Championship Division after failing to survive the relegation round at the 2016 IIHF World Women's U18 Championship.

Germany won the tournament after finishing first in the group standings with twelve points and gained promotion to the Championship Division for the 2018 IIHF World Women's U18 Championships. Slovakia also finished on twelve points however their loss to Germany placed them second due to tie-break rules. Norway finished in third place with eight points. France finished the tournament in last place after losing all five of their games and was relegated to Division I Group B for 2018. Millie Sirum of Norway finished as the top scorer of the tournament with eight points and was named best forward by the IIHF directorate. Hungary's Yumi Maruyama led the tournament in goaltending with a save percentage of 95.31. The directorate however named Johanna May of Germany as the tournaments best goaltender and named Norway's Lene Tendenes as the best defenceman.

Standings

Fixtures
All times are local. (CET – UTC+01:00)

Scoring leaders
List shows the top ten skaters sorted by points, then goals.

Leading goaltenders
Only the top five goaltenders, based on save percentage, who have played at least 40% of their team's minutes are included in this list.

Division I Group B tournament

The Division I Group B tournament began on 8 January 2017 in Katowice, Poland with games played at the Katowice Jantor. Following the announcement of the 2017 World Championship program it was revealed that the Division I tournament had been renamed Division I Group A to allow for the creation of a Division I Group B tournament. As a result, Italy, Kazakhstan, Great Britain, China and Poland were all promoted from last years qualification tournament after finishing second through to sixth respectively. Denmark joined as the sixth team at the tournament after finishing last in the 2016 Division I competition.

Italy won the tournament after winning all five of their games, finishing first in the group standings and gained promotion to the 2018 Division I Group A competition. Denmark finished in second placed after losing only to Italy and Poland finished in third place. Kazakhstan finished the tournament in last place after losing all five of their games and was relegated to the Division I Group B Qualification for 2018. Nadia Mattivi of Italy finished as the top scorer of the tournament with eleven points and was named best defenceman by the IIHF directorate. Italy's Eugenia Pomanin led the tournament in goaltending with a save percentage of 98.08. The directorate however named Martyna Sass of Poland as the tournaments best goaltender and named Denmark's Lilli Friis-Hansen as the best forward.

Standings

Fixtures
All times are local. (CET – UTC+01:00)

Scoring leaders
List shows the top ten skaters sorted by points, then goals.

Leading goaltenders
Only the top five goaltenders, based on save percentage, who have played at least 40% of their team's minutes are included in this list.

Division I Group B Qualification tournament

The Division I Group B Qualification tournament began on 26 January 2017 in San Sebastián, Spain with games played at the Palacio del Hielo Txuri Urdin. Australia and Romania returned to the competition after finishing seventh and eighth respectively in 2016 and missing promotion to Division I Group B. Mexico and Spain both made their debut at the IIHF World Women's U18 Championships.

Australia won the tournament after winning all three of their games, finishing first in the group standings and gained promotion to the 2018 Division I Group B competition. Spain finished in second place after losing only to Australia and Mexico finished in third. Italy's Natalia Amaya finished as the top scorer of the tournament with eight points, which included six goals and two assists. Imogen Perry of Australia led the tournament in goaltending with a save percentage of 100.00 in her 80 minutes of play.

Standings

Fixtures
All times are local. (CET – UTC+01:00)

Scoring leaders
List shows the top ten skaters sorted by points, then goals.

Leading goaltenders
Only the top five goaltenders, based on save percentage, who have played at least 40% of their team's minutes are included in this list.

References

External links
Division I Group A at IIHF.com
Division I Group B at IIHF.com
Division I Group B Qualification at IIHF.com

IIHF World Women's U18 Championship - Division I
IIHF World Women's U18 Championship - Division I
IIHF World Women's U18 Championship - Division I
IIHF World Women's U18 Championship – Division I
International ice hockey competitions hosted by Hungary
International ice hockey competitions hosted by Poland
International ice hockey competitions hosted by Spain
World
World
World